Astrid Olofsdotter (Norwegian: Astrid Olavsdatter; English: Aestrith) (died 1035) was the queen consort of King Olaf II of Norway.

Biography
Astrid was born to King Olof Skötkonung of Sweden and his Obotritian mistress Edla. She was the half sister of King Anund Jacob of Sweden and sister of King Emund the Old of Sweden. It is said that she and her brother Emund were not treated well by their stepmother, Queen Estrid, and that they were sent away to foster parents.  Astrid was sent to a man named Egil in Västergötland.

In 1016, it had been decided that Norway and Sweden should come to more peaceful relations by a royal marriage alliance. Noblemen of both countries tried to arrange a marriage between King Olaf of Norway and Astrid's legitimate half-sister, Princess Ingegerd Olofsdotter of Sweden, but Ingegerd was instead married to Yaroslav I the Wise, Grand Prince of Novgorod and Kiev. Instead Astrid was married to King Olaf in Sarpsborg in 1019. Some sources say that Astrid replaced Ingegerd by the wish of her father, while others say that the marriage took place against the will of her father, through the cooperation of King Olaf and the Swedish jarl Ragnvald Ulfsson.

Astrid was described as beautiful, articulate and generous, and well liked by others. She was the mother of Wulfhild of Norway (1020–1070), who married Ordulf, Duke of Saxony, and the stepmother of King Magnus the Good, with whom she had a good relationship. In 1030, she was widowed when her husband was killed. She left Norway and returned to the Swedish court, where she had a high position. When her stepson Magnus visited Sigtuna on his way to claim the Norwegian throne, she gave him her official support and encouraged Sweden to do so as well.

References

Sources

Lagerqvist, Lars O. Sverige och dess regenter under 1.000 år. Albert Bonniers Förlag AB. 1982. 
Thunberg, Carl L. Att tolka Svitjod [To interpret Svitjod]. Göteborgs universitet. CLTS. 2012. .

External links
 The family tree of Astrid Olofsdatter on Geni.com

Succession

|-

1035 deaths
Norwegian royal consorts
Astrid 1000
Year of birth unknown
House of Munsö
Fairhair dynasty
11th-century Swedish people
11th-century Norwegian people
11th-century Swedish women
11th-century Norwegian women
Daughters of kings